Bocholter Aa is a river of North Rhine-Westphalia, Germany, and the Achterhoek of the Netherlands. It flows through the town Bocholt. Its last part, before joining the Oude IJssel in Ulft, is called Aa-strang in Dutch.

See also
List of rivers of North Rhine-Westphalia

References

Rivers of Gelderland
Rivers of North Rhine-Westphalia
Rivers of the Netherlands
Rivers of Germany
International rivers of Europe